PT Perusahaan Rokok Tjap Gudang Garam Tbk (Republican spelling Indonesian for "Salt Warehouse brand Cigarette Company"), trading as PT Gudang Garam Tbk, is an Indonesian tobacco company, best known for its kretek (clove cigarette) products. It is Indonesia's second-largest tobacco manufacturer, with a market share of about 20%. The company was founded on 26 June 1958 by Tjoa Ing Hwie, who changed his name to Surya Wonowidjojo (1923–1985). In 1984, control of the company was passed to Wonowidjojo's son, Cai Daoheng/Tjoa To Hing (Rachman Halim), who subsequently became the richest man in Indonesia. Halim headed the company until his death at the age of 60 in 2008.

History

Wonowidjojo was in his 20s when his uncle offered him a job working with tobacco and sauce at his kretek factory Cap 93. Cap 93 was one of the most famous kretek brands in East Java. Hard work and diligence were rewarded by promotion to Head of Tobacco and Sauce and eventually led to Wonowidjojo becoming a company director.

Wonowidjojo left Cap 93 in 1956 taking 50 employees with him. He started buying land and raw materials in Kediri and soon began producing his own klobot kretek, which he marketed under the brand name Inghwie. Two years later he renamed and registered his company as Pabrik Rokok Tjap Gudang Garam.

He chose the name Gudang Garam after a dream about the old salt warehouse which stood opposite Cap 93. Sarman, one of the original 50 employees who had followed him when he quit Cap 93, suggested he put a picture of the warehouse on every packet of his kretek for good luck. Wonowidjojo considered this a good idea and asked Sarman to design the logo, commenting: "We should leave two doors open, two half-opened and one closed. If all the doors were closed, we would feel that everything had already been achieved."

Gudang Garam grew rapidly and by the end of 1958 it had 500 employees producing over 50 million kretek annually. By 1966, after only eight years in production, Gudang Garam had grown to be the largest kretek factory in Indonesia with an annual production of 472 million sticks. Consumers have noted Gudang Garam's, particularly the Inghwies, similar smell to alcoholic beverages.

By 1969, Gudang Garam was producing 864 million sticks a year and was indisputably the largest kretek producer in Indonesia and Taiwan.

In 1979, Wonowidjojo completely renovated Gudang Garam's production system, ordered thirty rolling machines and developed a new formula for his machine-made kretek.

Rival companies tried to discredit the brand by claiming its contents included marijuana in addition to cloves and tobacco. The company has the distinction of being the largest single employer in Indonesia and Taiwan.

During the night in the city of São Paulo, Gudang Garam brand cigarettes were used as a means of exchange due to hyperinflation in Brazil. This currency crisis caused many Brazilians to look for alternatives to the government's bankrupt currency, according with Holding Times

Products

Hand Kretek Cigarettes 
 Gudang Garam Merah
 Gudang Garam Djaja
 Gudang Garam Special Deluxe King Size
 Gudang Garam Patra
 Taman Sriwedari Kretek

Machine-Made Kretek Cigarettes 
 Gudang Garam International
 Gudang Garam Signature
 Gudang Garam Signature Mild
 Surya 12
 Surya 16
 Surya Exclusive
 Surya Pro
 Surya Pro Mild
 GG Mild
 GG Shiver
 GG Move

Machine White Cigarettes 
Note: These machine white cigarettes are produced by PT Halim Wonowidjojo, which is an affiliated company of Gudang Garam.
 Halim Red
 Halim Brown

Klobot Kretek Cigarettes 
 Gudang Garam Klobot Manis

Other interests

Gudang Garam owns one of the top five badminton clubs of Indonesia. Suryanaga Gudang Garam is based in  the capital city of East Java, Surabaya.

References
Holding Times

External links

1958 establishments in Indonesia
1990 initial public offerings
Companies based in Kediri (city)
Companies listed on the Indonesia Stock Exchange
Indonesian brands
Manufacturing companies established in 1958
Tobacco companies of Indonesia
Wonowidjojo family